Public transport in Cornellà de Llobregat (Catalonia, Spain, Cornellà henceforth) is an important part of the transportation network spanning the Metropolitan Area of Barcelona. The city of Cornellà, a mostly working-class area with strong dormitory town traits, is one of the most populated in the Baix Llobregat with about 90,000 inhabitants and a daily destination for thousands of commuters in the urban area of the capital.

Barcelona Metro stations
Barcelona Metro line L5 is operated by Transports Metropolitans de Barcelona (TMB) and is a regular rapid transit line. On the other hand, L8 is a Ferrocarrils de la Generalitat de Catalunya (FGC) service which grew out of a former commuter line, adapted to the standards, schedules and frequency of metro lines.

Commuter railway stations

Tram stations
All served by Trambaix.

Bus lines

Day services
 67 Barcelona (Plaça Catalunya) – Cornellà (Av. Fama) (via Sant Ildefons i Avinguda Diagonal)
 68 Barcelona (Plaça Catalunya) – Cornellà (Av. Fama) (via Pedralbes i Via Augusta)
 94 Almeda-Riera-Fontsanta-Centre-El Pedró-Sant Ildefons-Gavarra-Almeda(Bus urbà de Cornellà)
 95 Almeda-Gavarra-Sant Ildefons-El Pedró-Centre-Fonstsanta-Riera-Almeda(Bus urbà de Cornellà)
 L10 El Prat (Sant Cosme) – Sant Feliu (Consell Comarcal)
 L12: Barcelona (Plaça Reina Maria Cristina) - Cornella (Almeda)
 L46 Cornellà (Ambulatori) – Sant Just (Plaça Parador) (Bus urbà de Sant Joan Despí)
 L52 L'Hospitalet (Ciutat de la Justícia / Santa Eulàlia) – Sant Feliu (Plaça Pere Dot)
 L74 Cornellà (Sant Ildefons) – Sant Boi (Plaça Assemblea de Catalunya)
 L75 Cornellà (Centre) – Sant Boi (Plaça Assemblea de Catalunya)
 L77 Sant Joan Despí (Hospital Moisès Broggi) – Gavà Mar (per l'aeroport)
 L82 L'Hospitalet (Ciutat de la Justícia / Santa Eulàlia) – Gavà (Avinguda l'Eramprunyà) (Per Almeda)
 L85 L'Hospitalet (Ciutat de la Justícia / Santa Eulàlia) – Gavà (Avinguda l'Eramprunyà) (Per Sant Ildefons)

Night buses
 N13 Barcelona (Plaça Catalunya) – Sant Boi (Ciutat Cooperativa)
 N14 Barcelona (Plaça Catalunya) – Castelldefels (Centre)
 N15 Barcelona (Plaça Portal de la Pau - Plaça Catalunya) – Sant Joan Despí (Torreblanca)

See also
Transport in Barcelona
Transport in Badalona
Transport in Castelldefels
Transport in L'Hospitalet de Llobregat
Transport in Santa Coloma de Gramenet
Transport in Sant Adrià de Besòs
Transport in Montcada i Reixac

External links
Cornellà city council website.
 http://cornella.lamamacompra.com/c/transporte/136

 
Transport in Baix Llobregat